Olavina Nildana is an Indian television drama in the Kannada language that premiered on the Colors Kannada channel on 12 July 2022. It stars Ameeta Sadashiva Kulal and Akshay Nayak and is produced by Shruti Naidu.

Plot 
Olavina Nildana deals with current-generation youngsters' approach towards marriage. It examines how youngsters think about marriage institution. The serial also highlights how mindsets of youth have changed over years regarding families' involvement in their children's lives.

Cast

Main

Recurring 
 Ashok as Rajashekara Hosahalli: Tarini's grandfather; Palaksha and Uma's father
 Mandya Ramesh as Palaksha: Sadashiva's son; Tarini's uncle 
 Prathama Prasad as Sumati: Palaksha's wife; Tarini's aunt
 Dharmendra Urs as Sadananda: Tarini's father; Uma's husband
 Varalakshmi Srinivas as Uma: Tarini's mother; Palaksha's sister
 Aradhana Raghuram as Jagadishwari
 Chandrashekhar as Bhairav

Dubbed versions

References 

2022 Indian television series debuts
Indian television soap operas
Kannada-language television shows
Serial drama television series
Colors Kannada original programming